Claregalway GAA is a Gaelic Athletic Association club based in Claregalway, County Galway, Ireland. The club is a member of the Galway GAA. Underage teams up to U-16's play in the Galway league and championships, while the Minor, Under-21 and Senior teams compete in all further levels.

Although not a traditional stronghold of football, the success of the County Galway football teams in the 1950s/60s stimulated the imagination of local football enthusiasts. It was not long after Galways "Three In A Row" that the football club was founded in 1968.

Notable players include Brian O'Donoghue and Dan Cummins. Danny and Adrian are members of the county panel. Current Cork panellist Paddy Moran is a former underage star with the club.

At present, the club competes in the Senior Championship after being promoted in 2017 under the stewardship of Michael Coyle (jnr) after winning out in a replay against Shane Walsh in Tuam Stadium in very cold conditions.

Notable players
 Dan Cummins
 Jack Glynn, 2022 All Stars Young Footballer of the Year
 James Nallen
 Brian O'Donoghue

Honours

 Galway Junior Football Championships: 4
1986, 1993, 1998, 2007
 Galway Intermediate Football Championship: 2
 2002, 2017
 Galway Under-21 B Football Championship
2002
 Galway Under-21 A Football Championship
2019

References

External links
Official Claregalway GAA Club website

Gaelic football clubs in County Galway
Hurling clubs in County Galway
Gaelic games clubs in County Galway